The shadow of the law refers to settling cases or making plea bargains in a way that takes into account what would happen at trial. It has been argued that criminal trials resolve such a small percentage of criminal cases "that their shadows are faint and hard to discern."

The phrase was coined by law professors Robert H. Mnookin and Lewis Kornhauser, and was popularized by them in a 1979 law review article; it has since become common in sociolegal literature.

References

Pleas